Oakdale is a small rural community in Liberty County, Texas. A community by the same name was settled in Polk county in 1854. Old maps show Oakdale south of Cleveland, Texas. West of the Trinity river, Oakdale and Tarkington prairie supplied beef and rice to the railway during early Texas Republic. Oakdale is cattle country. Historical landmarks include Old Wells store Lucy F. Anderson residence, Hogan farm, office of Sam Houston, Indian Trace, Lynchburg 553, Sam Houston National Forest.

References 

Towns in Texas
Populated places established in 1854
1854 establishments in Texas
Populated places in Polk County, Texas